Darbandokeh is a village in Erbil Governorate in Kurdistan Region, Iraq. It is located in the Shaqlawa District.

In the village, there was a church of Mar Quryaqos.

Etymology
The name of the village is derived from "enclosed place" in Kurdish.

History
Darbandokeh was founded in 1928 by Assyrians from the refugee camp at Baqubah in the aftermath of the Assyrian genocide in the First World War, most of whom belonged to the Nochiya clan from Shemsdin in the Hakkari mountains in Turkey. By 1938, the village was inhabited by 108 Assyrians in 15 families.

In 1963, amidst the First Iraqi–Kurdish War, Darbandokeh was attacked and its Assyrian population was either killed or expelled by pro-government Kurds, who subsequently resettled the village; the church of Mar Quryaqos was also destroyed.

Notable people
Dinkha IV (1935–2015), Catholicos-Patriarch of the Assyrian Church of the East
Emanuel Kamber (b. 1949), Assyrian-American physicist

References
Notes

Citations

Bibliography

Populated places in Erbil Governorate
Historic Assyrian communities in Iraq
Kurdish settlements in Erbil Governorate